Eric Ferguson (born 12 February 1965) is a Scottish former footballer who played as a striker.

Ferguson joined Rangers from Gairdoch United. He went on loan to Clydebank and Southampton, before joining Dunfermline permanently. A second loan spell with Clydebank followed then moves to Raith Rovers and Cowdenbeath. Ferguson then transferred to Australia to play for Blacktown City in the National Soccer League.

References

External links
Eric Ferguson at Aussie Footballers
 

1965 births
Living people
Clydebank F.C. (1965) players
Dunfermline Athletic F.C. players
Raith Rovers F.C. players
Cowdenbeath F.C. players
Southampton F.C. players
Rangers F.C. players
Association football forwards
Scottish Football League players
Scottish footballers
Footballers from Fife
Scottish expatriate sportspeople in Australia
Scottish expatriate footballers
National Soccer League (Australia) players
Expatriate soccer players in Australia
Blacktown City FC players